El Tiro de Gracia is a studio album released by in 2008 by Regional Mexican artist Lupillo Rivera. El Tiro de Gracia garnered Rivera a Grammy nomination for Best Banda Album at the 51st Annual Grammy Awards.

Track listing
 De Que Me Presumes
 Por Debajo del Agua
 Dame
 Ya Lo Se
 Lo Raro Sería
 La Vida Es un Papalote
 Mi Corazón Ya Te Olvido
 Por Cuantas Mentiras
 Tiro de Gracia
 Perdido en el Vicio
 Gracias Por Haber Nacido
 Frente de la Barra
 La Fiesta Se Encuentra en Grande

Chart performance

References

2008 albums
Lupillo Rivera albums
Machete Music albums
Spanish-language albums